Castelo de Longroiva is a castle in Portugal. It is classified as a National Monument.

Castles in Portugal
Castle Longrovia
Longroiva